The men's javelin throw event at the 1973 Summer Universiade was held at the Central Lenin Stadium in Moscow on 19 and 20 August.

Medalists

Results

Qualification

Final

References

Athletics at the 1973 Summer Universiade
1973